Sainghin-en-Weppes is a commune in the Nord department in northern France. The commune is part of the Métropole Européenne de Lille.

Population

Heraldry

See also
Communes of the Nord department

References

Sainghinenweppes